The CALS Raster file format is a standard for the interchange of graphics data. It was developed by the United States Department of Defense (DoD) as part of the Continuous Acquisition and Life-cycle Support (CALS) initiative. It defines a standard storing raster (bit-mapped) image data, either uncompressed or compressed using CCITT Group 4 compression.

References
 MIL-R-28002 Requirement for Raster Graphics Representation in Binary Format
 MIL-PRF-28002

External links
CALS Raster File Format Summary

Graphics file formats
Technical communication